The Ambassador of Australia to Austria and Permanent Representative of Australia to the United Nations Office in Vienna is an officer of the Australian Department of Foreign Affairs and Trade and the head of the Embassy of the Commonwealth of Australia to the Republic of Austria in Vienna. The position has the rank and status of an Ambassador Extraordinary and Plenipotentiary and holds non-resident accreditation for Bosnia and Herzegovina (since November 1995), Hungary (since 2013), Kosovo (since 21 May 2008), Slovakia (since 1993), and Slovenia (since 5 February 1992) as a non-resident ambassador. From 1968 to 1974 the Ambassador held accreditation for Switzerland until it was transferred to a newly opened Embassy in Berne. An embassy existed in Budapest, Hungary, from 1972 till its closure in July 2013. From February 1992 to October 1999, the ambassador in Vienna also held accreditation to Croatia. From 1973 to 1978, responsibility for Czechoslovakia was held by the Ambassador resident in Vienna, when it was transferred to the Embassy in Warsaw.

The Ambassador is currently Richard Sadleir. Austria and Australia have enjoyed official diplomatic relations since 1966. The Ambassador also acts as Australia's Permanent Representative to the United Nations Office in Vienna since its establishment on 1 January 1980, including as the Representative and Governor on the Board of Governors of the International Atomic Energy Agency (IAEA) and the Comprehensive Test Ban Treaty (CTBTO) Preparatory Commission.

List of ambassadors

Notes
 Also non-resident Ambassador to the Swiss Confederation, 28 August 1968–1974.
 Also non-resident Ambassador to Czechoslovakia, 1973–1978.
 Permanent Representative to the United Nations in Vienna, 1 January 1980–present.
 Also non-resident Ambassador to the Republic of Croatia, 13 February 1992–October 1999.
 Also non-resident Ambassador to the Republic of Slovenia, 13 February 1992–present.
 Also non-resident Ambassador to the Slovak Republic, 1995–present.
 Also non-resident Ambassador to Bosnia and Herzegovina, November 1995–present.
 Also non-resident Ambassador to the Republic of Kosovo, 21 May 2008–present.
 Also non-resident Ambassador to Hungary, 1972–1985, and July 2013–present.

References

External links
 Australian Embassy and Permanent Mission to the United Nations, Austria

Australia–Kosovo relations
 
 
 
 
 
 
 
 
 
 
Austria
Australia